The Digital Economy and Society Index (DESI) monitors Europe's overall digital performance and tracks the progress of EU countries regarding their digital competitiveness. On annual basis, it monitors the performance of member states in digital connectivity, digital skills, online activity and digital public services in order to assess the state of digitalization of each member state as well as to identify areas requiring priority investment and action.

DESI includes 5 dimensions: 
 Connectivity (fixed and mobile broadband, prices)
 Human capital (Internet use, basic and advanced digital skills)
 Use of Internet services (citizens' use of content, communication, online transactions)
 Integration of digital technology (business digitalization, e-commerce)
 Digital public services (e-government, e-health)

Methodology 

The index consists of five main indicators, which are subdivided into three levels. Five indicators are located at the first level, namely Connectivity, Human Capital, Use of Internet, Integration of Digital Technology, and Public Digital Performances. At the second and third level, these five indicators are specified and divided into 13 subgroups of the second level and 34 subgroups of the third level.

After determining the indicators of the second and third levels and bringing them into a comparative form through the coefficients provided by the calculation methodology, there are 5 indicators of the first level, each of them corresponds to a specific weighting factor. After that, the final result of the index is calculated using the formula:

                                                         DESI = 

Where ai is the value of the і -the indicator of the first level, wi – the appropriate weighting factor (Table 1). Thus, the index DESI is calculated.

                                                                   

Source: Digital Economy and Society Index (DESI)

Connectivity 
The connectivity dimension of DESI index takes both the fixed and mobile broadband into account. Under the former, it evaluates the uptake of overall and ultrafast broadband of at least 100 Mbit/s, the availability of fast broadband with the next generation access and of fixed very high capacity networks (VHCNs). In addition, it considers the prices of retail offers. The latter being mobile broadband is concerned with 4G coverage, the uptake of mobile broadband (3G and 4G) and 5G readiness.

Broadband network deployments must keep pace with the rapidly growing internet traffic on fixed and mobile networks. Although the European Union has full coverage of basic broadband infrastructure, only 44% of households benefit from VHCN connectivity, which consists of fiber to the x (FTTX) and cable DOCSIS 3.1 technologies. Since FTTX and cable mostly concentrated in urban areas, connectivity in rural areas remains low with 20% of households. Countries scoring best on VHCN coverage, i.e. more than 90% coverage, are Denmark, Luxembourg and Malta. Conversely, in Greece, the UK, Cyprus and Austria less than 20% of households have access.

In 2016, European Commission took on The 5G Action Plan for Europe and provided the objective to deploy 5G network services in all European countries towards the end of 2020. 5G allows for a very high bandwidth and low latency connectivity to internet users as well as smart objects. The adoption of 5G spectrum serves as a necessary prerequisite for the commercial launch of 5G in every member state. Up till now, only 17 member countries have assigned any 5G spectrum and only 21% of the total 5G spectrum amount has been assigned at EU level. The best performing countries include Germany, Italy, Finland and Hungary.

Human capital 
The COVID-19 pandemic demonstrated how important digitalization has become to our economies and how basic and advanced digital skills have the ability to sustain our societies. While 85% of EU citizens used the internet prior to coronavirus pandemic, only 58% possessed at best some basic digital skills, which serve as the backbone of the digital society as without any digital skills, one cannot fully benefit from the use of digital technologies. The pandemic may have positively affected the number of internet users, but the development of digital skills did not come naturally with it. While basic usage skills allow individuals to take part in the digital society and consume digital goods and services, advanced skills can help empowering the workforce to develop new digital goods and services.

The human capital dimension of the index is divided into two sub-dimensions covering internet user skills and advanced skills and development. The former is a take on the commission's Digital Skills Indicator, which is calculated based on the number and complexity of activities that involve the use of digital devices and the internet. The latter sub-dimension deals with the workforce and its potential to work in as well as develop the digital economy. This takes into account the share of people in the workforce that poses ICT specialist skills and includes a separate indicator on female ICT specialists. Concurrently, it looks at the share of ICT graduates.

Use of Internet Services 
Engaging in a very wide range of online activities is possible for those citizens with an internet connection and the necessary skills to take advantage of it. Prior to the COVID-19 pandemic, already 85% of the citizens used the Internet already but, this crisis, has helped this percentage increase along with the interactions these users commit on the network. This dimension of the DESI calculates the number of people that uses the internet and what activities they perform online. Among them, some examples are the consumption of online content (e.g. entertainment such as music, movies, TV or games, obtaining media-rich information or engaging in online social interaction), using modern communication activities (e.g. taking part in video calls), and transaction activities such as online shopping and banking.

In the EU there are still a lot of differences in between member countries regarding the use of internet services. Finland, Sweden, the Netherlands and Denmark are the countries with the most active internet users, followed by the UK, Malta, Estonia and Ireland. In the other hand, Romania, Bulgaria and Italy are the least active ones. Ireland and Spain were the Member States that registered the biggest improvement in this dimension in comparison to previous years.

Using the internet for listening to music, playing games or watching videos is still the most common activity (81% of individuals who used internet in the last 3 months). Reading news online is the second most popular activity shown in the DESI (72%), while two thirds of internet users shop (71%) or bank online (66%).

Integration of Digital Technology 
Digital technologies make possible for companies to gain competitive advantage by improving their services, products and expanding their markets. This digital transformation of businesses furthers the development of new and trustworthy technologies at the same time as revealing new opportunities for them. This dimension of the DESI measure the digitalization of companies and e-commerce activities.

The top performers are Ireland, Finland, Belgium, the Netherlands, Denmark and Sweden with scores greater than 55 points (out of 100). At the other end of the scale, Bulgaria, Romania, Hungary Poland, Greece and Latvia are last with scores less than 35 points, significantly below the EU average, which is 43 points.

The leading countries on ‘4a business digitization’ (i.e. electronic information sharing, social media, big data and cloud) are Finland, the Netherlands and Belgium, with scores above 60 points. Bulgaria, Hungary, Poland, Romania, Latvia and Slovakia lag behind in the adoption of e-business technologies, scoring below 40 points. Ireland, Czechia, Denmark, Belgium and Sweden are the top five countries in ‘4b e-commerce’ (i.e. SMEs selling online, e-commerce turnover and selling online cross-border), with scores above 60 points. Ireland leads in all the three indicators under e-commerce while Bulgaria, Greece, Luxembourg and Romania are the worst countries with scores below 25 points.

Digital public services 
The last part of DESI revolves around e-Government. More specifically, it is measuring supply and demand side of digital public services, open data , pre-filled forms, completeness of online service, user centricity, key enablers such as electronic identification, eDocuments, authentic sources and digital post, and some other indicators.

Ranking 2022

References 

Indexes
Demographics of Europe
Europe-related lists